Dmitri Plekhanov (born March 13, 1978) is a Russian former professional ice hockey defenceman.  He played in the Russian Superleague for HC Neftekhimik Nizhnekamsk and Vityaz Chekhov. He was drafted 232nd overall in the 1997 NHL Entry Draft by the St. Louis Blues.

External links

1976 births
Living people
HC Neftekhimik Nizhnekamsk players
Russian ice hockey defencemen
St. Louis Blues draft picks
HC Vityaz players
People from Nizhnekamsk
Sportspeople from Tatarstan